Snežana Aleksić (born 14 January 1989 in Titograd, SFR Yugoslavia) is Montenegrin female basketball player. She currently play for North Macedonian KAM Basket as shooting guard. She is also member of national team of Montenegro.

National team

References

External links
Profile at FIBA Europe
Profile at eurobasket.com

1989 births
Living people
Sportspeople from Podgorica
Montenegrin women's basketball players
Shooting guards
ŽKK Gospić players
Montenegrin expatriate basketball people in Croatia
Montenegrin expatriate basketball people in Greece
Montenegrin expatriate basketball people in Russia
Montenegrin expatriate basketball people in Turkey
Montenegrin expatriate basketball people in Hungary
Montenegrin expatriate basketball people in Switzerland
Montenegrin expatriate basketball people in Spain
Montenegrin expatriate basketball people in Argentina
Montenegrin expatriate basketball people in Bulgaria